Daniel Jesús Granja Peniche (born 7 August 1986) is a Mexican politician from the Institutional Revolutionary Party. In 2012 he served as Deputy of the LXI Legislature of the Mexican Congress representing Yucatán.

References

1986 births
Living people
Politicians from Yucatán (state)
People from Mérida, Yucatán
Institutional Revolutionary Party politicians
21st-century Mexican politicians
Deputies of the LXI Legislature of Mexico
Members of the Chamber of Deputies (Mexico) for Yucatán